Tavares Lamont Taylor (born January 6, 1993), known  professionally as Lil Reese, is an American rapper from Chicago, Illinois. Hailing from Chicago's drill scene in the early 2010s, he is known for his collaborations with fellow rappers Chief Keef, Fredo Santana, and Lil Durk. In 2012, Taylor was featured on Chief Keef's single "I Don't Like", which peaked at number 73 on the Billboard Hot 100, peaked at number 20 on the Hot R&B/Hip-Hop Songs chart, and peaked at number 15 on the Hot Rap Songs chart. His debut mixtape, ‘Don't Like’ was released later that year. Since the first mixtape release, Taylor has gone on to release six mixtapes in total, including the 2013 ‘Supa Savage’ mixtape, as well as three EPs, including the 2017 collaborative project ‘Supa Vultures’ EP with Lil Durk.

Career
Taylor gained recognition when he was featured on Chief Keef's hit "I Don't Like", which garnered widespread international attention. He then began to receive popularity through his music videos, including "Us" and "Beef". He then caught the eye of producer No I.D., who had produced albums or tracks for artists such as Common, Kanye West, and others, which led Taylor to sign with hip hop label Def Jam.

In November 2012, he released a remix for his song "Us" with Rick Ross and Drake which later appeared on Rick Ross' mixtape The Black Bar Mitzvah. Taylor also created many songs with up-and-coming music producers, such as Young Chop. He is also featured on Juelz Santana's song "Bodies". In January 2013, Taylor released a remix to his song "Traffic" featuring Young Jeezy and Twista. On September 2, 2013, Taylor released his second solo mixtape Supa Savage, featuring guest appearances from Chief Keef, Lil Durk, Fredo Santana, Wale and Waka Flocka Flame.

Legal issues
In May 2010, Lil Reese pleaded guilty to burglary charges and was given two years of probation.

On October 24, 2012, a video allegedly showing Lil Reese assaulting a woman was posted to the internet. On April 28, 2013, Lil Reese was arrested by Chicago Police on a warrant issued two days earlier, based on criminal trespass to a residence with persons present, battery, and mob action from the video incident from February 2012.

On June 23, 2013, Lil Reese was arrested in Chicago and charged with motor vehicle theft after an incident on April 13, 2013, where he was not able to provide proof of ownership for a BMW 750Li. However, the charge was later dropped. On July 13, 2013, Lil Reese was arrested again in Chicago for marijuana possession, a violation of his probation.

Personal life

2019 shooting 
On November 11, 2019, Taylor was shot in the neck and critically wounded at a busy intersection in the area of Markham and Country Club Hills. Country Club Hills police responded to 167th Street and Pulaski Road around 2:30 p.m. Witnesses told police Taylor was pursued by a driver of another car during a chase. Witnesses reported hearing as many as 12 gunshots during the chase. The driver of that vehicle got out of his car and shot the man with what witnesses called a small rifle and then fled the scene.

On November 18, Taylor sent out information about being released from the hospital and that he survived the shooting and is "Alive and Well". A day after leaving the hospital, he released a new song "Come Outside".

Twitter racism controversy 
In March 2020, during the COVID-19 pandemic, Taylor posted a controversial message on Twitter: "Chinese people nasty asl man got the whole [world] fuck up". Many condemned him, calling his tweets racist. Taylor faced immediate backlash for his comment; many asked him to delete the tweet. After his Twitter account was suspended, he went on Instagram to post a screenshot of the official violation notification from Twitter with the captions, "Lol Look how the Chinese people did my Twitter".

2021 shooting 
On May 15, 2021, Taylor and two other men were injured in a shootout at a parking garage in Chicago and were taken to Northwestern Memorial Hospital. His eye was grazed by a gunshot; he and another of the men, who was shot in the knee, were later listed in fair to good condition, and the third in critical condition with multiple wounds to the torso. The shooting was reportedly over a stolen Dodge Durango.

Discography

Mixtapes
 Don't Like (2012)
 Supa Savage (2013)
 Supa Savage 2 (2015)
 300 Degrezz (2016)
 Better Days (2017)
 GetBackGang (2018)
 GetBackGang 2 (2019)
 Supa Savage 3 (2021)

EPs
 Supa Vultures (w/ Lil Durk) (2017)
 Normal Backwrds (2018)
 Lamron 1 (2020)
 Lamron 2 (2021)

Singles

As a lead artist

As a featured artist

Guest appearances

References

External links

1993 births
Living people
African-American male rappers
American shooting survivors
Def Jam Recordings artists
Drill musicians
Gangsta rappers
Midwest hip hop musicians
Rappers from Chicago
21st-century American rappers
21st-century American male musicians
21st-century African-American musicians